Barros  is one of eight parishes (administrative divisions) in the Asturian city of Langreo, a municipality within the province and autonomous community of Asturias, in northern Spain and a parish of the same name. It is located between the districts of Riaño and La Felguera.

Villages

Population
Its population is about 1,000 inhabitants, and covers an area of 2.63 km².

Feasts
Barros celebrates its feast in honor of the Immaculate Conception in August.

Facilities
In Barros, the Stephen Hawking Neurological Disability Center is being completed. Barros has a train stop for the Cercanías Asturias RENFE, from the C-2 line, and bus lines that connect to Oviedo, Avilés, Gijón and the rest of the Nalón Valley. Its inhabitants are called pozaricos. Economic development is by means of the valley and La Felguera coal extraction industries. In Barros there is still an old mine,  el Pozo Barros, and its limits is the old Nitrastur Factory.

Parishes in Langreo
Langreo